Metacoceras is a nautilitoid cephalopod from the Upper Carboniferous (Pennsylvanian) and Permian, the shell of which is moderately evolute with a subquadrate whorl section, bearing nodes on the ventral or umbilical shoulders or both, but otherwise smooth. The siphuncle is small, subcentral and orthochoanitic. The suture has shallow ventral and lateral lobes but no dorsal or annular lobe.

Matacoceras, named by Hyatt, 1883, is a genus in the nautilid superfamily Tainocerataceae. Its distribution is cosmopolitan.

Aulametacoceras, also a tainoceratid genus, is like Metacoceras except for having several longitudinal ridges and grooves along the venter. It is also a later genus with a more limited distribution, found in the Lower Permian and Upper Triassic in North America (U.S.A) and Europe (Alps).Mojvaroceras is a tainoderatid genus, like Metacoceras'' and its direct evolutionary descendant, differing in being slightly more involute and having a lobe on the inner, dorsal, side. It is known from Triassic sediments in Eurasia and western North America.

References

External links 
Bernhard Kummel, 1964.  Nautiloidea-Nautilida. Treatise on Invertebrate Paleontology, Part K. Geological Soc. of America and University of Kansas press. Teichert and Moore (eds)

Nautiloids
Pennsylvanian first appearances
Permian genus extinctions